In complex geometry, a part of mathematics, a Calabi–Eckmann manifold (or, often, Calabi–Eckmann space), named after Eugenio Calabi and Beno Eckmann, is a complex, homogeneous, non-Kähler manifold, homeomorphic to a product of two odd-dimensional spheres of dimension ≥ 3.

The Calabi–Eckmann manifold is constructed as follows.  Consider the space , where , equipped with an action of the group :

 

where  is a fixed complex number. Since M is a quotient space of a holomorphic action, it is also a complex manifold. It is obviously homogeneous, with a transitive holomorphic action of 

A Calabi–Eckmann manifold M is non-Kähler, because . It is the simplest example of a non-Kähler
manifold which is simply connected (in dimension 2, all simply connected compact complex manifolds are Kähler).

The natural projection

 

This makes M into a principal T-bundle.

Calabi and Eckmann discovered these manifolds in 1953.

Notes

Complex manifolds